Ravindra Kumar (born 1960) is editor and managing director of The Statesman, one of India's best-known and oldest newspapers. He writes on Indian politics and on South-Asian and South-east Asian affairs.

Early life 
Born in New Delhi, India on 24 July 1960, he was a director of United News of India, a leading Indian news agency, from 1992 to 2008, and twice its chairman. He was the chairman of Media Research Users' Council for 2012-13 and president of the Indian Newspaper Society in its platinum jubilee year, 2013-14. During this period he wrote a book, "Threescore and Fifteen - The story of the Indian Newspaper Society". The first copy of the book was presented to the President of India, Pranab Mukherjee, at a function to mark the platinum jubilee. A founding member of the executive board of Asia News Network, a grouping of 22 Asian newspapers, he was twice its chairman.

Positions 
 Member, Executive Committee (and past president), Indian Newspaper Society
 Founding member (and past Chairman), Asia News Network
 Member, Board of Governors (and past chairman), Media Research Users' Council
 Member, Council of Management, All India Management Association
 Member, Executive Board, Konrad Adenauer Asian Center for Journalism

Awards 
 Durga-Ratan Award for Investigative Journalism, 1986

See also
Ian Stephens (editor)

References

External links 
 

1960 births
Living people
People from New Delhi
Indian newspaper editors
Indian male journalists
Journalists from Delhi